The Provincetown International Film Festival (PIFF) is an annual film festival founded in 1999 and held on Cape Cod in Provincetown, Massachusetts. The festival presents American and international narrative features, documentaries and short films for five days in June of each year.

The festival is a program of the Provincetown Film Society, the non-profit parent organization which also operates the year-round Waters Edge Cinema (formerly known as Whaler's Wharf Cinema), a year-round Provincetown movie theater presenting what it considers the best in current independent and international cinema.

The festival hosts films and panel discussions and incorporates the cultural, historic, and artistic character of Provincetown: with its thriving art colony, its large gay and lesbian population, its original Native American and Portuguese heritage, and its congenial scenic setting. In keeping with its mission, the festival often presents films about countercultural figures, such as John Lennon, Allen Ginsberg, William S. Burroughs, BeBe Zahara Benet, and Andrea Dworkin.

In 2022, the Provincetown International Film Festival became an Academy Awards-qualifying festival. Short films that receive Best Narrative Short, Best Queer Short and Best Documentary Short awards are automatically eligible to enter the Short Films competition for the concurrent season of the Oscars.

History 
Founded in 1999, the first opening night film was Run Lola Run.

Other notable premieres have included A Master Builder, Hedwig and the Angry Inch, American Splendor, Whale Rider, Hunt for the Wilderpeople, Cameraperson, Howl, The Innocents, Brittany Runs a Marathon, Vita & Virginia, and Coffee & Cigarettes. Retrospective screenings have included Some Like It Hot, Grey Gardens, Clerks, Showgirls, Sunday Bloody Sunday, Faster, Pussycat! Kill! Kill! and the 50th anniversary of Psycho.

Notable attendees include Lily Tomlin, Ted Kennedy, Victoria Reggie Kennedy, Jim Jarmusch, Kevin Smith, Tilda Swinton, D.A. Pennebaker, Chris Hegedus, Ira Kaplan, Al Maysles, Faith Hubley, Parker Posey, Mira Nair, Christine Vachon, Alan Cumming, Chloe Sevigny, Michael Musto, Patricia Clarkson, David Cronenberg, Todd Haynes, Sofia Coppola, Gus Van Sant, Jillian Bell, Tab Hunter, Ang Lee, Barney Frank and former FBI deputy director Andrew McCabe.

Cult filmmaker John Waters hosts events or presents awards at PIFF every year.

Awards
In its ongoing mission to honor the work of both established and emerging directors, PIFF has established a number of awards.

Awarded Films 

In addition to the usual "best film" types of awards, each year PIFF presents three unique and prestigious awards:

Filmmaker on the Edge Award, presented to a film artist whose outstanding achievement, innovation, and vision continue to push the boundaries of film.

Excellence in Acting Award, presented to a film artist whose admirable body of work pushes the boundaries of the medium, demonstrating originality and innovation.

Next Wave Award, presented to a film artist who has an exciting and distinctive voice, takes artistic risks, and has a passionate commitment to independent film.

Filmmaker on the Edge Award 
 1999: John Waters
 2000: Christine Vachon
 2001: Ted Hope & James Schamus
 2002: Gus Van Sant
 2003: Todd Haynes
 2004: Jim Jarmusch
 2005: Mary Harron
 2006: Gregg Araki
 2007: Todd Solondz
 2008: Quentin Tarantino
 2009: Guy Maddin
 2010: Kevin Smith
 2011: Darren Aronofsky
 2012: Roger Corman
 2013: Harmony Korine
 2014: David Cronenberg
 2015: Bobcat Goldthwait
 2016: Ang Lee
 2017: Sofia Coppola
 2018: Sean Baker
 2019: John Cameron Mitchell
 2021: Richard Linklater
 2022: Luca Guadagnino

Excellence in Acting Award
 2002: Marcia Gay Harden
 2006: Lili Taylor
 2007: Alan Cumming
 2008: Gael García Bernal
 2009: Alessandro Nivola
 2010: Tilda Swinton
 2011: Vera Farmiga
 2012: Parker Posey
 2013: Matt Dillon
 2014: Patricia Clarkson
 2016: Cynthia Nixon
 2017: Chloe Sevigny
 2018: Molly Shannon
 2019: Judith Light
 2021: Riz Ahmed
 2022: Dale Dickey

Next Wave Award 
 2017: Aubrey Plaza
 2018: Chloe Grace Moretz
 2019: Jillian Bell
 2020: Mya Taylor
 2021: Natalie Morales
 2022: Jenny Slate & Bowen Yang

Career Achievement
2007: Kathleen Turner
2008: Michael Childers
2009: Strand Releasing
2011: Albert Maysles

Faith Hubley Memorial Award
2003: Mira Nair
2008: Jane Lynch
2010: Rob Epstein and Jeffrey Friedman
2012: Kirby Dick
2013: Edward Lachman
2014: Debra Winger
2015: Jennifer Coolidge

References

External links
Provincetown Film Society
Provincetown Film Festival
Waters Edge Cinema

Film festivals in Massachusetts
Provincetown, Massachusetts
Film festivals established in 1999